List of chairmen of the Landsråd of Greenland.

The Landsråd was created in 1951.

This is a list of chairmen of the Landsråd:

Sources
Rulers.org
Guided Tour of Inatsisartut

Politics of Greenland
Greenland